Frank Hagar Bigelow (August 28, 1851 in Concord, Massachusetts – March 2, 1924) was a United States scientist.

Biography
Bigelow's mother took an interest in astronomy, and her involvement caught his interest.  Bigelow was educated at the primary and high school in Concord, in the Boston Latin School, Harvard College (graduated 1873), and at the Episcopal Theological School in Cambridge, Massachusetts, and entered orders. For some years he was assistant astronomer in the Argentine National Observatory in Cordoba. This service (1873–76; 1881–83) was interrupted for his theological studies, and for the short time (1880–81) after entering orders he was a rector in Natick, Massachusetts. Later he was professor of mathematics in Racine College, Wisconsin, assistant in the National Almanac office in Washington, D.C., and in 1891 he became professor of meteorology in the United States Weather Bureau in Washington. He was also an assistant rector of St. John's Church in Washington.

Work
His name is especially associated with an instrument for the photographic record of the transit of stars and with some novel studies by which the solar corona, the aurora, and terrestrial magnetism are shown to be associated. The theories met with a favorable reception in scientific circles.

Writing
He edited the Monthly Weather Review (1909–10). He published many articles on the subjects of his work and a monograph on the “Solar Corona,” published by the Smithsonian Institution (1889).  His later writings were devoted to an isolated effort to reform meteorology through his publications.  This bore little or no fruit.

Notes

References

External links
 
 
 

1851 births
1924 deaths
19th-century American Episcopal priests
American astronomers
American meteorologists
Harvard College alumni
Boston Latin School alumni
20th-century American Episcopal priests